Rokan Sara (also Romanized as Rokan Sarā) is a village in Howmeh Rural District, in the Central District of Rasht County, Gilan Province, Iran. At the 2006 census, its population was 114, in 33 families.

References 

Populated places in Rasht County